Chryseobacterium taihuense  is a Gram-negative, facultatively anaerobic and non-motile bacteria from the genus of Chryseobacterium which has been isolated from the Lake Tai in Wuxi in China.

References

Further reading

External links
Type strain of Chryseobacterium taihuense at BacDive -  the Bacterial Diversity Metadatabase

taihuense
Bacteria described in 2013